Pernem–Karwar Suburban Railway is a suburban railway which is operational under the Konkan Railways of Indian Railways. It serves the area around Goa and parts of Karnataka (Karwar alone). The DMU, EMU and MEMU trains are operated as local train in this suburban railway. It started operations on 1 April 2015.

Time and distance of station of train

References 

Suburban rail in India
Konkan Railway